Mesothen is a genus of moths in the subfamily Arctiinae. The genus was erected by George Hampson in 1898.

Species
The genus includes the following species:

References

 
Euchromiina
Moth genera